Omar Sebastián Pérez Marcos (born 29 March 1981 in Santiago del Estero) is an Argentine retired footballer who played as a midfielder.

Career
Peréz began his playing career with Boca Juniors in 2000, during his time with the club he was part of several championship winning squads. Between 2000 and 2003 the club won three Copa Libertadores, 2 Copa Intercontinental and an Argentine league championship.

In 2003 Peréz joined Banfield where he played until 2004.

In 2004 Peréz moved to Colombian side Junior where he played until 2007, with a short loan spell with Jaguares of Mexico in 2005. He was part of the championship winning team of Apertura 2004.

Since 2007 he has played for Real Cartagena, Independiente Medellín and Club Santa Fe of Colombia.

Career statistics

Source:
Notes

Honours
Boca Juniors
 Copa Intercontinental (1): 2000
 Copa Libertadores (3): 2000, 2001, 2003
 Primera División Argentina (1): Apertura 2000

Junior
 Colombian Professional Football (1): 2004-II

Santa Fe
 Copa Sudamericana (1) : 2015
 Copa Colombia (1): 2009
 Categoría Primera A (3): 2012-I, 2014-II, 2016–II
 Superliga Colombiana (3): 2013, 2015, 2017.

External links

 
 
 Argentine Primera statistics at Fútbol XXI  

1981 births
Living people
People from Santiago del Estero
Argentine footballers
Association football midfielders
Boca Juniors footballers
Club Atlético Banfield footballers
Chiapas F.C. footballers
Atlético Junior footballers
Independiente Medellín footballers
Independiente Santa Fe footballers
Patriotas Boyacá footballers
Argentine expatriate footballers
Argentine Primera División players
Liga MX players
Categoría Primera A players
Expatriate footballers in Colombia
Expatriate footballers in Mexico
Argentine expatriate sportspeople in Colombia
Argentine expatriate sportspeople in Mexico
Sportspeople from Santiago del Estero Province